This is a list of licensed video games based on tabletop role-playing games and miniature wargames.

Battlecars
Video game based on the Battlecars wargame:
Battlecars (1984)

BattleTech
For video games based on BattleTech and games in the MechWarrior series, see List of BattleTech games#Video games.

Buck Rogers XXVC
Video games based on the Buck Rogers XXVC RPG:
Buck Rogers: Countdown to Doomsday (1990)
Buck Rogers: Matrix Cubed (1992)

Champions
MMORPG based on Champions RPG:
Champions Online (2009)

Cyberpunk
Action RPG based on the Cyberpunk 2020 RPG:
Cyberpunk 2077 (2020)

The Dark Eye
For video games based on the German RPG The Dark Eye, see The Dark Eye#Video games.

Dungeons & Dragons
For video games based on Dungeons & Dragons, see List of Dungeons & Dragons video games.

Heavy Gear
Video games based on Heavy Gear:
Heavy Gear (1997)
Heavy Gear II (1999)

Numenera
Video game based on the Numenera RPG:
Torment: Tides of Numenera (2017)

Ogre
Video games based on the Ogre wargame:
Ogre (1986)
Ogre (2017)

Rifts
Video game based on the Rifts RPG:
Rifts: Promise of Power (2005)

RuneQuest
Video game based on the RuneQuest RPG:
King of Dragon Pass (1999)

Shadowrun
For video games based on Shadowrun, see Shadowrun#Video games.

Skyrealms of Jorune
Video game based on the RPG Skyrealms of Jorune:
Alien Logic: A Skyrealms of Jorune Adventure (1994)

Space: 1889
Video game based on the Space: 1889 RPG:
Space: 1889 (1990)

Traveller
Video games based on the Traveller RPG:
MegaTraveller 1: The Zhodani Conspiracy (1990)
MegaTraveller 2: Quest for the Ancients (1991)

Tunnels & Trolls
Video game based on the Tunnels & Trolls RPG:
Tunnels & Trolls: Crusaders of Khazan (1990)

Twilight 2000
Video game based on the Twilight 2000 RPG: 
Twilight 2000 (1991)

Warhammer
For video games based on Warhammer Fantasy and Warhammer 40,000, see List of Games Workshop video games.

World of Darkness
Video games based on the World of Darkness:
Hunter: The Reckoning (2002)
Hunter: The Reckoning: Wayward (2003)
Hunter: The Reckoning: Redeemer (2003)
Vampire: The Masquerade – Redemption (2000)
Vampire: The Masquerade – Bloodlines (2004)